is a feminine Japanese given name.

Possible writings
Chisato can be written using different kanji characters and can mean:
千里, "great distance"
知里, "knowledge, hometown"
智里, "wisdom, hometown"
千聖, "thousand, holy"
千郷, "thousand, hometown"
The name can also be written in hiragana or katakana.

People with the name
, Japanese actress
, Japanese trampoline gymnast 
, Japanese sprinter
, Japanese badminton player
, Japanese professional footballer
, Japanese professional footballer 
Chisato Katsura (千里 かつら), Japanese ballet dancer, First Artist of The Royal Ballet
Chisato Minamimura British dancer and choreographer 
, Japanese professional fitness competitor 
, Japanese gravure idol, tarento, actress
, Japanese singer-songwriter
Chisato Nakajima (中島 千里), Japanese voice actress
, Japanese bobsledder 
, Japanese idol
Ōe no Chisato (大江千里) Japanese waka poet and Confucian scholar
, Japanese singer, member of the girl group Cute
, Japanese long-distance runner
, Japanese figure skater
, Japanese retired track and field sprinter
, Japanese fashion designer
, Japanese rugby sevens player
with the stage name Chisato
Chisato (千聖), a guitarist of the Japanese band Penicillin

Fictional characters
Chisato, a minor character in the computer role-playing game Suikoden V
Chisato, a character in the anime series Vampire Princess Miyu
Chisato Arashi, a character in the media franchise Love Live!
Chisato Jōgasaki, a character in the Tokusatsu series Denji Sentai Megaranger
Chisato Madison, a character in the role-playing video game Star Ocean: The Second Story
Chisato Matsui, a character in the novel and film Battle Royale
Chisato Mera, a character in the manga series The Disastrous Life of Saiki K.
Chisato Nishikigi, a character in the anime series Lycoris Recoil
Chisato Shirasagi, a character in the media franchise BanG Dream!

See also
Chisato Station (Mie), a train station in Tsu, Mie Prefecture, Japan
Chisato Station (Toyama), a train station in Toyama, Toyama Prefecture, Japan

Japanese feminine given names